FAW Haima Automobile Co., Ltd., trading as Haima, is a Chinese automotive manufacturing company based in Haikou, Hainan and a subsidiary of FAW Group. Its principal activity is production of passenger cars for other companies.

Haima was founded in 1992 as a joint venture between the Hainan provincial government and Mazda to produce Mazda models for sale in China. In 2006, FAW acquired one share of the venture, although many Haima models still incorporate Mazda technology.

As of 2012 Haima had an annual production capacity of approximately 400,000 vehicles. A total of 157,242 Haima passenger cars were sold in China in 2013, making it the 28th largest-selling car brand in the country in that year (and the 12th largest-selling Chinese brand).

On July 2021,  FAW transfered 49% of the shares of FAW Haima to Hainan Development Holdings Co., Ltd. (Hainan Holdings) at no charge. Haima Automobile  holds 51% of the shares in FAW Haima, while Hainan Holdings hold 49% of the shares.

Name
The name "Haima" is a contraction of "Hainan Mazda".

History
The company was founded in January 1992 as Hainan Mazda Motor, a joint venture between the Hainan provincial government and Mazda to produce Mazda models for sale in China. The joint venture arrangement lasted until 2006, when Mazda's share of Hainan Mazda was acquired by FAW Group, and the company became a subsidiary of FAW. While Haima retained the right to make and sell older Mazda models as well as use Mazda technology to underpin self-designed products, it was prohibited from using the Mazda marque. This doesn't necessarily mean Haima has completely severed ties to its erstwhile partner, as technology transfers may continue.

In August 2008 Haima began construction of a third assembly plant in Hainan, with a capacity to build of 100,000 units per year. Its other two plants are likely located in Haikou, Hainan, and the city of Zhengzhou; both have production capacities of 150,000 whole vehicles per year.

In April 2009 Reuters reported that the company's partnership with Mazda, by then ended, had been established "to receive technological help" and that Haima was selling a car that seemed similar one of Mazda's offerings without consent.

In November 2010 a plant for the assembly of knock-down kits of the Haima 3 was opened in Cherkessk, Russia by Derways Automobile Company.

Announced in December 2016 that Haima to build a manufacturing plant in Bulgaria starting 2018.  It will be the second Chinese company to build a factory in Europe following those of Litex Motors, the official distributor of Great Wall Motor.

On July 2021,  FAW transfered 49% of the shares of FAW Haima to Hainan Development Holdings Co., Ltd. (Hainan Holdings) at no charge. Haima Automobile  holds 51% of the shares in FAW Haima, while Hainan Holdings hold 49% of the shares.

Products

Current products
Haima currently produces the following vehicles, a number of which include technology acquired from Mazda:

 Haima - Zhengzhou :
Haima 1 "Aishang" (爱尚) EV- Only electric version still in production.
Haima Fstar microvan
 Haima - Hainan :
Haima M3 sedan (1.5 litre)
Haima M5 sedan (1.5 and 1.6 litre)
Haima M6 sedan
Haima M8 sedan (1.8 and 2.0 litre)
Haima Freema EV- Only electric version still in production.
Haima S5 Young CUV 
Haima S5 CUV (1.6 litre)
Haima 6P PHEV CUV
Haima S7 CUV (2.0 litre)- (Previously named the Haima 7)
Haima F7 MPV- (Previously named the Haima V70)
Haima 8S CUV 
Haima 7X MPV

Former products
Vehicles formerly produced by Haima include:
Mazda 929
Haima HMC6450 minivan (a van based on the Mazda MPV (LV) series)
Mazda 6440 minivan
Haima 3 hatchback (1.6 litre)
Haima 3 sedan (1.6 litre)
Haima 2 hatchback (1.3 and 1.5 litre)
Haima 1 "Aishang" (爱尚) (1.0 litre)
Haima 1 "Prince" (王子) (1.0 litre)
Haima HMC6470L station wagon (a rebadged Mazda Luce)
Haima Family/ Happin(CA7130) sedan / Family VS sedan / hatchback(1.6 litre) (a rebadged Mazda 323/Mazda Familia)
Haima CA6430M hatchback
Haima Freema (a rebadged Mazda Premacy) (1.6 and 1.8 litre)

Logo
Haima's logo represents a mythical bird flying away from a rising sun.

Motorsport
Haima competes in the China Touring Car Championship through the Haima Family team.

Sales

References

External links

Haima Automobile

FAW Group divisions and subsidiaries
Vehicle manufacturing companies established in 1992
Car manufacturers of China
Electric vehicle manufacturers of China
Companies based in Hainan
Chinese brands
Mazda